Jordy Zielschot Taal (born 3 February 1995) is a Dutch footballer who plays for Hoofdklasse club Achilles Veen.

Club career
He made his Eerste Divisie debut for RKC Waalwijk on 9 November 2018 in a game against Jong PSV and allowed 5 goals in that game.

References

External links
 

1995 births
Living people
People from Dongen
Footballers from North Brabant
Dutch footballers
Association football goalkeepers
RKC Waalwijk players
Eerste Divisie players
Derde Divisie players
Vierde Divisie players
SteDoCo players
VV Dongen players
Blauw Geel '38 players
Achilles Veen players